Punctularia is a genus of fungi in the family Punctulariaceae. The genus contains two widely distributed species.

References

Corticiales
Agaricomycetes genera
Taxa named by Narcisse Théophile Patouillard
Taxa described in 1895